Lesbian, gay, bisexual, transgender (LGBT) related organizations and conferences range from social and support groups to organizations that are political in nature. Some groups are independent, while others are officially recognized advocacy groups within mainstream religious organizations.

 For groups whose primary purpose is campaigning for the legal rights of LGBT people, please see List of LGBT rights organizations.
 For organizations affiliated with political parties, please see List of LGBT organizations that affiliate with political parties.
 For organizations primarily serving LGBT medical professionals or promoting LGBT health, please see List of LGBT medical organizations.

International 
 Affirming Pentecostal Church International — an Apostolic Pentecostal denomination operating in the US and many other countries
 All Out — a global not-for-profit organisation that is focused on political advocacy for the human rights of LGBT people
 Axios — organization of Eastern Orthodox, Byzantine Rite, and Eastern Catholic Christians who are LGBT
 Emergence International — support group for LGBT Christian Scientists (not to be confused with Scientology)
 Federation of Gay Games — fosters LGBT self-respect through the Gay Games, an organized international participatory athletic and cultural event
 Frontrunners — LGBT running and walking clubs
 GALA Choruses — Gay and Lesbian Association of Choruses
 Gay Games —  an organized international participatory athletic and cultural event held every four years
 Global Alliance of Affirming Apostolic Pentecostals (GAAAP) (Encompasses the former Apostolic Restoration Mission) International LGBT-Affirming Apostolic (Oneness) Pentecostal denomination
 GRIN Campaign — campaigning for social and political equality in education
Lavender Languages and Linguistics Conference — an international conference for queer linguistics
 International Association of Gay Square Dance Clubs
 International Conference on Bisexuality
 International Mister Leather
 InterPride —  an organization of over 200 Pride event organisers
 Metropolitan Community Church
 OutRight Action International — international human rights organization dedicated to improving the lives of people who experience discrimination or abuse on the basis of their sexual orientation, gender identity or expression
 Q Christian Fellowship — global membership and attendance, but conference has only been hosted in the United States
 Sisters of Perpetual Indulgence

Africa

Algeria 

 Trans Homos DZ

Nigeria 

 Bisi Alimi Foundation

Morocco 

 Kif-Kif

South Africa 
 Coalition of African Lesbians
 Lesbian and Gay Equality Project
Gender DynamiX

Zimbabwe 
 GALZ

Asia

China 
 Tong-Kwang Light House Presbyterian Church
 Beijing Queer Chorus

Hong Kong 

 Transgender Resource Center

India 
 Fifty Shades of Gay (FSOG)
 Orinam
 Srishti Madurai
 LABIA
 Gay Bombay
 Sangama (human rights group)
 Sappho for Equality
 Sahodari Foundation

Israel 
 Black Laundry —  Israeli LGBT anarchist group which campaigns against the occupation of the Palestinian territories, and other issues
 Israel Gay Youth (IGY)
 The Israeli Gay, Lesbian, Bisexual and Transgender Association — also called "the Aguda", the biggest LGBT rights association in Israel
 Tehila — Support for the parents of LGBT people
 Tel Aviv Municipal LGBT Community Center —  Tel Aviv-Yafo's City community center for LGBTQ people.

Japan 

 Arima LGBT Support Group ありまま(LGBTグループ)
 プライドハウス東京 - Pride House Tokyo Japan 2020
 Clinic For Rainbows
 Kobe IDAHO 神戸IDAHO
 LGBT Gakushin Circle 学習院大学LGBTサークルにじがく
 LGBT Families and Friends Association LGBTの家族と友人をつなぐ会
 Miyoshi Real Estate Group for LGBT 三好不動産フレンズ（LGBT）
 Nijidiversity NPO 
 Nijiro Kazoku / Rainbow Families にじいろかぞく
 Osaka Sexual Minorities and Neurodiversity Support Group 発達障害 × セクマイの会 @大阪
 Rainbow Pride Ehime Film Festival
 Sapporo Rainbow Pride (March) さっぽろレインボープライド
 Startline Home Care Agency NPO法人Startline. net / 訪問介護事業所SAISON
 Stonewall Japan Nonprofit
 Takarazuka Human Rights Division ありのままに自分らしく【宝塚市人権男女共同参画課】

Nepal
Blue Diamond Society

Philippines 
 Philippine LGBT Chamber of Commerce

Singapore

Taiwan 
 Taiwan Tongzhi Hotline Association

Australia and Oceania

Australia 
 Australian Lesbian and Gay Archives — community-based organization committed to the collection and preservation of material reflecting the lives and experiences of LGBT Australians
 Queers in Science - a Melbourne-based initiative aiming to build community and improve support for LGBTQIA+ people working in STEMM (Science, Technology, Engineering, Mathematics, and Medicine) in Australia

Coral Sea Islands 
 Gay and Lesbian Kingdom of the Coral Sea Islands — world's first LGBT micronation

New Zealand 
 Intersex Trust Aotearoa New Zealand —  also known as Intersex Awareness New Zealand
 Rainbow Youth

Europe 
BGLBC – BeNeLux LGBTIQ+ Business Chamber

East meets West -- a network of LGBTIQ professionals from Western & (primarily) Eastern Europe founded in 2013. It acts as the LGBTIQ Business Chamber for CEE Region (Central & Eastern Europe).

EGLCC – European LGBTIQ Chamber of Commerce -  umbrella organization for national European LGBTIQ Chambers of Commerce

European Forum of Lesbian, Gay, Bisexual and Transgender Christian Groups — an association of LGBT Christian groups in Europe for equality and inclusion for LGBT people within and through Christian churches and other religious bodies and multilateral organisations.

Germany 
 Berlin LGBTIQ+ Tech Week
BiBerlin e.V.
BVT* - Der Bundesverband Trans* setzt sich für eine Gesellschaft ein, in der alle trans* Personen in Würde leben. Sicher, selbstbewusst und selbstbestimmt.
Casa Kuà - Trans*Inter*Queer Community Health Center
DIE LINKE.queer
GGLBC German LGBTIQ+ Business Chamber -- GGLBC German LGBTIQ+ Business Chamber was founded as part of a ceremony in the Cologne Chamber of Commerce and Industry in 2019
LGBTQ STEM Berlin
QueerJS Berlin
Quaurteera - Russian-speaking queer community in Germany
Proudr
RAHM
UHLALA
Schwarz-Lila Panke
she*claim
STICKS & STONES - The LGBTIQ+ Job & Career Fair & Platform

Trans Day of Visibility Berlin
Unicorns in Tech (conference)

Hungary 
 Háttér Society
 LGBT+ Hedgehog club
 Labrisz Lesbian Association
 Budapest Pride
 Hungarian LGBT Alliance

Ireland 
 Hirschfeld Centre — an LGBT community centre operating in Dublin, Ireland, from 1979 to 1997
 House of STEM — a community-led initiative to improve LGBTQ+ support, visibility and representation in STEM (Science, Technology, Engineering and Maths) and STEM-related fields in Ireland 
 Outhouse — an LGBT community and resource centre operating in Dublin, Ireland, from 1996 to present day

Italy 

 Italian GLBT Business Chamber (IGLBC)

Scotland 
 Affirmation Scotland — advocacy group composed of Church of Scotland members, works for a more LGBT-affirming denomination
 OutScotland

Sweden 
 Swedish Federation for Lesbian, Gay, Bisexual and Transgender Rights (RFSL)
Scandinavian LGBT Chamber of Commerce (SGLCC)

Switzerland 
 Pink Cross —  Swiss LGBT umbrella organization

United Kingdom 

 Albert Kennedy Trust — organization supporting LGBT homeless
 Albany Trust —  educational and counseling organization
 BiCon (UK) - organization for bisexuals that hosts an annual convention.
 BiFest — social-support organization for bisexuals
 Broken Rainbow — charity and support group for victims of same-sex domestic violence
 Ditch the Label — a non-profit anti-bullying organisation
 InterEngineering — a professional network aiming to connect, inform and empower lesbian, gay, bisexual and transgender engineers and their straight allies
 FLAGS – Active Support Unit for Lesbians and Gays in Scouting — active Support Unit for LGBT people in The Scout Association
 London Gay Men's Chorus
 OutBritain - UK’s first LGBT+ Chamber of Commerce
Outdoor Lads - social gay men’s group
 Pride in STEM - a charitable trust that aims to showcase LGBT people in STEM fields
 Project for Advice, Counselling and Education
Proud2Serve — online network for UK Armed Forces
 Ski Bums
Switchboard — helpline providing support for LGBT+
 Quakers — religious society of friends. Allows gay marriage and considers all equal

North America 
 North American Gay Amateur Athletic Alliance
 Pink Pistols - a gay gun rights organization
 ReconcilingWorks

Canada 
 Chouettes Coquettes — social group for lesbian and bisexual women in Montreal who are their 20s and 30s
 Church of Nomromism — LGBT-affirming religious organization based in British Columbia
 Gay Line — a non-profit telephone helpline in Montreal, Canada
 GLBTTQ Community Centre of Ottawa
 Kind Space — a queer community centre located in Ottawa, Ontario
 Pride Library
 129th Toronto Scouting Group
 The 519 — serving both the Church and Wellesley neighbourhood of Toronto, Ontario, and the broader lesbian, gay, bisexual and transgender (LGBT) communities in the Toronto area
 Lambda Foundation

United States 

 8th Day Center for Justice
 Adodi — one of the oldest black gay organizations in the US
 American Institute of Bisexuality — organization for bisexuals
 Association of Welcoming and Affirming Baptists — group of individuals, organizations, and congregations which advocate full LGBT-inclusion in Baptist churches
 BAGLY — organization for LGBTQ+ youth in Greater Boston
 Bash Back —  network of anarchist and anti-authoritarian queer projects
 Bay Area Bi+ & Pan Network — organization for bisexuals
 Bay View Garden and Yard Society (BVGAYS) — a non-profit gardening and community organization in Milwaukee, Wisconsin
 Bet Mishpachah —  Jewish worshiping community in Washington, D.C.
 Bialogue — organization for bisexuals
 BiNet USA — organization for bisexuals
 Bisexual Resource Center — organization for bisexuals
 Bisexual Social Network — Program for bisexuals under non-profit organization Step Up For Mental Health
 Center for Sex Positive Culture — aka the Wet Spot
 Chinese Rainbow Network (CRN)
 Commercial Closet Association
 Connecticut Gay Men's Chorus
 Consortium of Higher Education LGBT Resource Professionals
 DignityUSA  — lay organization of LGBT-affirming Roman Catholics, not a church-sanctioned organization
 El/La Para TransLatinas
 Gay and Lesbian Labor Activists Network
 Gay, Lesbian, Bisexual, Transgender and Straight Alliance (GLBTSA) at the University of North Carolina at Chapel Hill (UNC-CH)
 Gay Men's Chorus of Los Angeles
 Gay Men's Chorus of Washington, D.C.
 Gayglers
 Gender Justice League
 GLAAD
 Global LGBTQI+ Employee & Allies at Microsoft
GLSEN
 Grace Gospel Chapel — an LGBT friendly Evangelical Christian church in Seattle, Washington
 Greater Seattle Business Association — a.k.a. GSBA, the largest regional LGBT & allied chamber of commerce in the United States and second-largest chamber of commerce in Washington State
 Growing American Youth of St. Louis
 Gulf Coast Archive and Museum of Gay, Lesbian, Bisexual & Transgender History (GCAM) —  formed in Houston, Texas, by a group of concerned activists so that our collective histories could be saved – as well as be available for educational uses – through the utilization of a museum or similar venue
 Horizon Services — alcohol and drug recovery organization based in the San Francisco Bay Area —  which operates some programs specifically targeting the LGBT community
 Hudson Pride Connections Center
 IntegrityUSA
 Independent Gay Forum
 Indy Pride, Inc. – serving the LGBTQ community in and near Indianapolis, Indiana
 Lesbian Avengers
 Lesbian Herstory Archives
 Lesbian Sex Mafia
 LGBT Chamber of Commerce Illinois 
 Mazzoni Center 
 MASALA (Massachusetts Area South Asian Lambda Association)
 Montrose Center
 More Light Presbyterians
 Muslim Alliance for Sexual and Gender Diversity
 National Gay Basketball Association
 National Gay Prisoners Coalition
 National LGBT Chamber of Commerce
 National Lesbian and Gay Journalists Association
 National Organization of Gay and Lesbian Scientists and Technical Professionals Inc (NOGLSTP)
 New Ways Ministry
 New York Area Bisexual Network — organization for bisexuals
 Oakland Gay Men's Chorus
 OutCare Health
 Out in Science, Technology, Engineering, and Mathematics, Inc. (oSTEM) — a global society dedicated to educating, empowering and fostering leadership for LGBTQA+ communities in the STEM fields.
 Pacific Center for Human Growth
 Point Foundation
 Pride365
 PrideArts 
 Pride Foundation
 Principle 6 campaign
 Pro-Life Alliance of Gays and Lesbians
 Queer Cultural Center
 Queer Student Cultural Center
 Reaching Out MBA
 Rich Eychaner Charitable Foundation
 Ruth Ellis Center
 San Francisco Gay Men's Chorus
 Scouting for All
 Sexuality Information and Education Council of the United States
 Ski Bums
 SPLASH Youth of Northern Colorado — LGBTQIA+ programming for young people, all identities and orientations, ages 5–20
 StartOut
 Stonewall Shooting Sports of Utah
 The Gay and Lesbian Community Center of Southern Nevada — serving the LGBTQ community in and near Las Vegas, Nevada
 Transcending Boundaries Conference — a Northeast American convention for the bisexual community; for genderqueer, transgender, intersex, and polyamorous people, and for their family, friends, and straight allies.
 TransTech Summit — The TransTech Summit provides attendees with tools to grow their existing careers, interact with new media technology, network with other LGBT people.

See also

 Intersex civil society organizations
 List of LGBT organizations that affiliate with political parties
 List of LGBT rights organizations
 List of bisexuality-related organizations

References

External links
 

Lists of LGBT-related organizations